Sarah Hake is an American plant developmental biologist who directs the USDA's Plant Gene Expression Center in Albany, CA. In 2009 she was elected a fellow of the American Association for the Advancement of Science and elected member of the National Academy of Sciences.

Early life and education 

Hake lived in Iowa until she was 10 years old and then moved to California. She attended Grinnell College, graduating in 1975. As an undergraduate she accompanied a professor to the Botanical Garden in St. Louis which convinced her to study plant biology. After working as a waitress for a year after college, she was accepted into the PhD program at Washington University in St. Louis where she completed her PhD with Virginia Walbot, studying, among other things, the proportion of the DNA in the maize genome which was present as multiple copies. She met Michael Freeling when she was a graduate student and, impressed by research which considered outside the range of traditional genetic research at the time, wrote an NIH proposal to work as a postdoc in his lab at the University of California, Berkeley cloning the gene ADH1. After cloning the ADH1 gene, Hake and Freeling wrote and received a second grant to clone the Knotted1 gene, which they succeeded in doing in 1989.

After completing her postdoc she was hired as a principal investigator at the USDA Plant Gene Expression Center in Albany, CA. She currently serves as the director for the Center and is an adjunct professor in the Department of Plant and Microbial Biology at the University of California, Berkeley.

Research 
Hake considers her single most important scientific contribution to be the cloning of Knotted1 the first cloned plant gene with an effect on development. Postdocs working in her lab have gone on to clone other genes controlling maize development including terminal
ear1, barren inflorescence2, fasciated ear2, tangled, and indeterminate spikelet1.

Recognition 
 In 2007 Hake received Stephen Hales prize from American Society of Plant Biologists.
 In 2009 Hake was elected a fellow of the American Association for the Advancement of Science.
 In 2009 Hake was elected to the National Academy of Sciences.

Personal life 
Hake has two children born while she was a postdoc. Since she was a postdoc at UC-Berkeley, Hake and her family live on the Gospel Flat Farm near Bolinas, California.

References

External links 
 

Grinnell College alumni
Washington University in St. Louis alumni
University of California, Berkeley College of Natural Resources faculty
American geneticists
Living people
Fellows of the American Association for the Advancement of Science
Members of the United States National Academy of Sciences
Year of birth missing (living people)